The Texas Geographical Union (TGU) is the Geographical Union (GU) for rugby union teams playing in Texas and portions of  Arkansas, Louisiana, and Oklahoma for USA Rugby. It is a non-profit organization and is the primary overseeing body for the promotion of rugby union in the region.

The TGU is divided into four divisions: Men, Women, College men, and College Women.

Men's clubs

Division 1
 Austin Blacks
 Austin Huns
 Dallas Harlequins
 Dallas Rugby
 Houston Athletic

Division 2/D1b
 
 Alamo City Rugby
 Austin Blacks D2
 Austin Huns D2
 Dallas Athletic
 Dallas Harlequins D2
 Dallas Rugby D2
 Euless Texans
 Fort Worth Rugby
 Houston Athletic D2
 Houston United
 Katy Lions
 San Antonio Rugby
 The Woodlands Rugby

Division 3
 
 Abilene Rugby
 Alliance Rugby
 Austin Blacks D3
 Austin Huns D3
 Bay Area Rugby
 Corpus Christi Crabs
 Corpus Christi Dogfish
 Dallas Diablos
 Dallas Rugby D3
 Denton Rugby
 Fort Hood Phantoms
 Galveston Rugby
 Grand Prairie Mavericks
 Houston Arrows
 Houston United D3
 Kingwood Crusaders
 Lone Star Rugby
 McAllen Knights
 San Antonio Rugby D3
 San Marcos Greys
 Shreveport Rugby

College Men
 Red River Conference D1
 Southwest Conference D2

Women's Clubs

Division 1
 Austin Valkyries
 Dallas Harlequins
 Houston Athletic
 Little Rock Stormers

Division 2
 Austin Valkyries D2
 Dallas Athletic
 Griffins Rugby
 Oklahoma Roses
 San Antonio Rugby
 Tulsa Rugby

College Women
 Southwest Women's Conference

See also
Rugby union in the United States

References

External links
Official website
USA Rugby Official Site
IRB Official Site

Rugby union governing bodies in the United States
Sports organizations established in 2013
2013 establishments in Texas
Rugby union in Texas